Chepni is one of the 24 Oghuz Turkic tribes.

History
In the legend of Oghuz Qaghan, the Chepni was stated as one of the clans of the tribe of Gök Han that consists of Pecheneg (Beçenek), Bayandur (Bayındır), Chowdur (Çavuldur) and Chepni, a part of Üç-Oklar branch of the Oghuz Turks. According to Mahmud al-Kashgari's Dīwān Lughāt al-Turk, it was the 21st tribe of the 22 Oghuz tribes.

They had been converted to Islam (Sunni and Alevi). According to a Turkish historian, Faruk Sümer, the first murids of Haji Bektash Veli may have been the Chepni residents of Suluca Kara Üyük (now a town of Nevşehir Province in the Central Anatolia region of Turkey) and some Turkish historians claim that Haji Bektash Veli may be of Chepni origin. Chepni people had an important role in the conquest of Trebizond during the 15th century whereas they had already started to conquer the provinces of Samsun and Sinop in 13th centuries. Most of Turkish people who settle in Gümüşhane, Giresun, Ordu, Samsun and the west of Trabzon descend from Chepni people. There are also people from Chepni descent mainly in the cities of Çanakkale, Balıkesir, İzmir, Gaziantep , Manisa and Denizli.

People with Chepni origin has also been called "Çetme", "Çetmi", "Çitme"  in various regions of Anatolia where they named the villages they settled with these.

Language
In the 1330s, some Turkmens appeared in the coastal regions of the Pontus. A remarkable feature of the Pontic situation is that some groups of nomads apparently wandered Trapezuntine territories as subjects of the Grand Komnenoi. In addition to the case of the Christian Çepni, this is substantiated by linguistic data. According to Brendemoen, by the 14th century, a group of Pontic Chepni nomads was bilingual and spoke both Turkic and Greek. Moreover, the earliest Turkic dialect of the Pontos was based on the Aqqoyunlu Turkic dialect under the influence of Pontic Greek.

Settlements

Turkey
Chepni are mainly concentrated in the provinces of Giresun and Ordu in the Eastern Black Sea Region but also live in Gaziantep, Trabzon, and Balıkesir.

Turkmenistan
In Turkmenistan, Chepni is a clan among Geklen Turkmens living in the west of the country.

See also
Küresünni
Chepni of Rumkale

References 

Chepni people
Ethnic groups in Turkey
Turkoman tribes
Turkish people